Barnet was a parliamentary constituency in what is now the London Borough of Barnet, which returned one Member of Parliament (MP) to the House of Commons of the Parliament of the United Kingdom.

History and boundaries
The House of Commons (Redistribution of Seats) Act 1944 set up Boundaries Commissions to carry out periodic reviews of the distribution of parliamentary constituencies. It also authorised an initial review to subdivide abnormally large constituencies (those exceeding an electorate of 100,000) in time for the 1945 election.  This was implemented by the Redistribution of Seats Order 1945 under which Hertfordshire was allocated an additional seat.  As a consequence, the new County Constituency of Barnet was formed from the St Albans constituency, comprising the Urban Districts of Barnet and East Barnet, and the Rural District of Elstree.

For the 1950 general election, the Rural District of Hatfield was also added from St Albans, but from the 1955 general election, this was transferred back out to the Hertford constituency.

In 1965 the Barnet and East Barnet urban districts were transferred to Greater London, becoming part of the London Borough of Barnet, while Elstree Rural District remained part of Hertfordshire. This did not affect parliamentary boundaries for nine years, however.

When seats were next redistributed, with effect from the February 1974 general election, the Greater London parts of the old constituency moved to the new Borough Constituency of Chipping Barnet. The Elstree Rural District was transferred to the new County Constituency of South Hertfordshire.

Members of Parliament

Elections

Election in the 1940s

Elections in the 1950s

Elections in the 1960s

Election in the 1970s

References and sources
References

Sources
 Boundaries of Parliamentary Constituencies 1885-1972, compiled and edited by F.W.S. Craig (Parliamentary Reference Publications 1972)

Parliamentary constituencies in London (historic)
Parliamentary constituencies in Hertfordshire (historic)
Constituencies of the Parliament of the United Kingdom established in 1945
Constituencies of the Parliament of the United Kingdom disestablished in 1974
Politics of the London Borough of Barnet
History of the London Borough of Barnet